Ganden Phodrang was the Tibetan government established by the 5th Dalai Lama, which lasted until the 2011, when the 14th Dalai Lama devolved power to a democratically elected Lobsang Sangay Prime Minister, also known as Sikyong.

Ganden Phodrang may also refer to:
 The estate of the Dalai Lamas at Drepung Monastery of the same name.
 The labrang, or the institution of the Dalai Lamas.
 The Tibetan Government in Exile, see Central Tibetan Administration.